HD 31134, also designated as HR 1561, is a solitary star located in the northern circumpolar constellation Camelopardalis, the giraffe. It is faintly visible to the naked eye as a white-hued star with an apparent magnitude of 5.74. Gaia DR3 parallax measurements place it 473 light years away. At its current distance, HD 31134's brightness is diminished by 0.35 magnitudes due to interstellar dust. It has an absolute magnitude of +0.19.

The object has a stellar classification of A2 Vs, indicating that it is an A-type main-sequence star with sharp or narrow absorption lines due to slow rotation. Two sources remove the s prefix and instead list it as an ordinary dwarf star while one lists it as a more evolved giant star. Abt and Morell (1995) list it as a slightly hotter peculiar Ap star, but it is now considered unlikely to be chemically peculiar. HD 31134 is a rather evolved star, having completed 97.6% of its main sequence lifetime at the age of 432 million years.

References

A-type main-sequence stars
Camelopardalis (constellation)
BD+52 00898
031134
1561
022936